Bailie Philip Braat (born 1976) is a Scottish Labour politician serving as the Lord Provost of Glasgow from 2020 until 2022. He previously served as Deputy Lord Provost from 2017 to 2020. He has represented the Anderston/City/Yorkhill ward since May 2007.

Private life
Braat grew up in Essen, Belgium, and is a native speaker of both English and Dutch.

Career

Law career
Braat is a graduate of law from the University of Glasgow, specialising in Commercial Property Law. He has held a series of senior positions since his election to Glasgow City Council in 2007, including City Treasurer, Convener of Strathclyde Pension Fund and Convener of the former Strathclyde Police Authority. He is also an Honorary Officer in the Royal Navy Reserves.

Political career

Braat has served as a councillor on Glasgow City Council since 3 May 2007, representing the Anderston/City/Yorkhill ward for the Scottish Labour Party. He serves on the ward's Area Partnership, and on Emergency Committee and International Strategy Board committees within the council.

In 2017, he was appointed at Deputy Lord Provost of Glasgow and in 2020 was appointed as the Lord Provost, holding that office until 2022.

References

External links
 Phillip Braat, Glasgow City Council 
 Philip Braat at LinkedIn

1974 births
Living people
Scottish Labour councillors
Councillors in Glasgow
Scottish lawyers
Alumni of the University of Glasgow
21st-century Scottish lawyers
KU Leuven alumni
Scottish people of Belgian descent
Alumni of the University of Strathclyde